Year 161 (CLXI) was a common year starting on Wednesday (link will display the full calendar) of the Julian calendar. At the time, it was known as the Year of the Consulship of Caesar and Aurelius (or, less frequently, year 914 Ab urbe condita). The denomination 161 for this year has been used since the early medieval period, when the Anno Domini calendar era became the prevalent method in Europe for naming years.

Events

By place

Roman Empire 
 March 7 – Emperor Antoninus Pius dies, and is succeeded by Marcus Aurelius, who shares imperial power with Lucius Verus, although Marcus retains the title Pontifex Maximus.
 Marcus Aurelius, a Spaniard like Trajan and Hadrian, is a stoical disciple of Epictetus, and an energetic man of action.  He pursues the policy of his predecessor and maintains good relations with the Senate. As a legislator, he endeavors to create new principles of morality and humanity, particularly favoring women and slaves. 
 Aurelius reduces the weight of a goldpiece, the aureus, from 7.81 grams to 7.12 grams.
 Autumn – The Parthians invade Armenia, and install their own candidate on the throne. A legion (perhaps Legio IX Hispana) is destroyed at Elegeia.

By topic

Art and Science 
 Gaius' Institutiones are published.

Commerce 
 The silver content of the Roman denarius falls to 68 percent under Emperor Marcus Aurelius, down from 75 percent under Antoninus Pius.   
</onlyinclude>

Births 
 August 31 – Commodus, Roman emperor (d. 192)
 Liu Bei, founder of the Shu Han (Three Kingdoms) (d. 223)
 Lü Dai, general of the Eastern Wu state (Three Kingdoms) (d. 256)

Deaths 
 March 7 – Antoninus Pius, Roman emperor (b. AD 86)
 Athenais, Roman noblewoman (b. AD 143)

References 

 

als:160er#161